The Adventures of Roc Raida ...One Too Many! is the debut album by an American turntablist Roc Raida. It was released in 1997 for Fat Beats.

Track listing
"Asia & Roc Raida Intro" 
"Plug Tunin'" 
"Paul Revere" 
"I Got It Made" 
"Girls I Got Them Locked" 
"Friends" 
"DXT Speaks Over A Dope Beat" 
"Dave" 
"Jingle Bell" 
"Sing A Simple Song" 
"Break Through" 
"Kool Is Back" 
"New Rap Language" 
"One For The Treble" 
"Rock It" 
"Disco Dream"
"Larry's Theme" 
"Let's Make A Dope Deal" 
"Pumpkin and the Allstars" 
"Funk Box" 
"Hot Day Master Mix" 
"King Tut" 
"Triple Threat" 
"Still Making A Dope Deal" 
"Hardcore" 
"Cold Gettin Dumb" 
"He Cuts So Fresh" 
"Devotion" 
"Rock It In The Pocket" 
"Impeach The President" 
"God Made Me Funky" 
"Cutting It Up" 
"Knock Em Out Sugar Ray" 
"Nautilus" 
"Ike's Mood" 
"World Famous"

1997 debut albums
Roc Raida albums